Chazaria is a genus of moths of the family Noctuidae.

Species
 Chazaria incarnata (Freyer, 1838)

References
 Chazaria at Markku Savela's Lepidoptera and Some Other Life Forms
 Natural History Museum Lepidoptera genus database

Heliothinae
Moth genera